Florentius Sului Hajang Hau (11 December 1948 − 18 July 2013) was an Indonesian Roman Catholic archbishop.

Ordained to the priesthood in 1973, Sului Hajang Hau was named bishop of the Roman Catholic Diocese of Samarinda, Indonesia in 1993. In 2003, he was appointed Archbishop of the Roman Catholic Archdiocese of Samarinda and died in 2013 while still in office.

References

1948 births
2013 deaths
People from West Kutai Regency
Dayak people
Indonesian Roman Catholic archbishops